Claudio Zin (born 11 November 1945) is an Italian-Argentinian physician and politician. He was Senator of the Italian Republic representing the Italian people living in South America between 2013 and 2018 belonging to Associative Movement Italians Abroad. 

He was born in Bolzano and emigrated with his family to Argentina when he was 5 years old, eventually returned to Italy to live in Milano at age of 15, but moved again to Argentina. In Argentina, he studied medicine at the University of Buenos Aires. He works as a journalist in the Argentina media writing about medicine. 

During the administration of Daniel Scioli as governor of Buenos Aires he served as Minister of Public Health between 2007 and 2009.

References

1945 births
Living people
Senators of Legislature XVII of Italy
Politicians from Bolzano
21st-century Italian politicians
20th-century journalists
21st-century journalists
University of Buenos Aires alumni
Italian emigrants to Argentina
Argentine journalists
Male journalists
21st-century Argentine politicians